"Troublemaker" is a song that was originally released as an iTunes single from alternative rock band Weezer's sixth album and third self-titled album, Weezer (also referred to by fans and the band as The Red Album). It was released in digital form on May 20, 2008, as the second single from the album. It debuted the week of July 26, 2008, at No. 39 on the Billboard Hot Modern Rock Tracks charts and peaked at No. 2.

This song was originally planned to be the first single for the album, but "Pork and Beans" was chosen instead.

Rivers Cuomo has stated the song, along with others from The Red Album, were heavily influenced by rapper Eminem and his "fun way of using rhymes."

Weezer played an acoustic version of "Troublemaker" on the May 30, 2008, episode of Alternative Nation on Sirius Radio.

The song was released as a downloadable track for the games Rock Band (along with "Dreamin'" and "The Greatest Man That Ever Lived") and Tap Tap Revenge.

The song was also used for TV commercials for CBS'''s crime drama show The Mentalist, which premiered in September 2008. It is also used in the trailer for Fired Up. "Troublemaker", along with "The Greatest Man That Ever Lived", appeared in the documentary Warren Miller's Children of Winter.

Official remixes
These remixes were released on a promo EP:

 Troublemaker (Azzido Da Bass Remix)
 Troublemaker (Azzido Da Bass Dub Remix) (5:27)
 Troublemaker (Tiny Evil Remix) (6:52)
 Troublemaker (Richard Vission Remix) (4:05)
 Troublemaker (Richard Vission Dub Remix) (5:37)
 Troublemaker (Funky Monk Remix) (6:02)
 Troublemaker (Baby Disaster Remix) (3:17)

Charts
Weekly charts

Year-end charts

Music video
Weezer fans were invited to take part in the music video for "Troublemaker." The music video (directed by The Malloys) took place outside of The Forum in Inglewood, California. It consists of the band performing the song, with shots of the band members and fans breaking Guinness World Records, such as "Largest Air Guitar Ensemble", "Most People on a Skateboard", "Longest Session of Guitar Hero World Tour''", "Largest Game of Dodgeball", and "Most People in a Custard Pie Fight". The music video was released on October 6, 2008.

Personnel
Rivers Cuomo – lead guitar, lead vocals
Patrick Wilson – drums, percussion, backing vocals
Brian Bell – rhythm guitar, backing vocals
Scott Shriner – bass guitar, backing vocals

References

External links

2008 singles
2008 songs
Weezer songs
Songs written by Rivers Cuomo
Song recordings produced by Jacknife Lee
Music videos directed by The Malloys
Geffen Records singles